The Dacia 1325, also known as 1325 Liberta or simply as Liberta, was a car manufactured by Romanian auto marque Dacia.

History
Produced from 1991 until 1996,the Dacia 1325 was the hatchback version of the third generation Dacia 1310 (1989–1993), as well as the hatchback version of the fourth generation 1310 (1993–1998). Some photos exist of the Dacia 1325 Liberta with the final CN4 front fascia, although rare, and the successor of Dacia 1320 (1987–1990), which was the hatchback version of the second generation Dacia 1310 (1983-1989).
At first it was just a copy of the old 1310, but in 1993 underwent a facelift similar to 1310's facelifting the same year and stayed in production until 1996.

Engines

See also
 Dacia 1320
 Dacia 1300

References

External links
 Dacia 1325 Liberta at autoevolution.com
 Dacia 1325 at automobileromanesti.ro

1325
Cars of Romania
Front-wheel-drive vehicles
Compact cars
Euro NCAP small family cars
Hatchbacks
Cars introduced in 1990
Cars discontinued in 1996